Tejpal Tawar is a former member of the Haryana Legislative Assembly from the BJP representing the Sohna Vidhan sabha Constituency in Haryana. The Kunwar Sanjay Singh replace Tejpal Tawar from the Sohna Vidhan sabha Constituency in Haryana.

References 

Sohna Election Result 2019
https://www.hindustantimes.com/assembly-elections/haryana-assembly-polls-tejpal-tanwar-sohna-mla/story-dkUBdGNpQGFNtnBFiT099J.html
https://www.oneindia.com/politicians/tejpal-tanwar-63305.html

Members of the Haryana Legislative Assembly